South Attleboro station is an MBTA Commuter Rail Providence/Stoughton Line station in Attleboro, Massachusetts. It is located under Newport Avenue (Route 1A) in the South Attleboro neighborhood, just north of the Rhode Island border. The station has two side platforms serving the two tracks of the Northeast Corridor, connected by a footbridge to a park-and-ride lot.

Construction of the station was approved in 1987 and completed the next year. Opening was delayed by a dispute between the Massachusetts Bay Transportation Authority (MBTA) and the Massachusetts Architectural Access Board (MAAB) because the station was not accessible. After the MBTA and MAAB reached an agreement on the length of accessible platforms, the station opened in July 1990. The footbridge is in poor condition, with two sets of stairs closed off. The MBTA issued a contract for design of station improvements, including a new footbridge with elevators, in 2020. The station was temporarily closed on February 26, 2021.

Station design
South Attleboro station is located under the Newport Avenue (Route 1A) overpass at the far southern edge of Attleboro, just  from the Rhode Island line. The station has two -long side platforms bracketing the two tracks of the Northeast Corridor. A footbridge with ramps and currently-closed stairs connects the south (northbound) platform to the southbound platform and the parking lot on the north side of the tracks. The 579-space parking lot fills before the end of the morning peak.

History

Former stations
The Boston and Providence Railroad (B&P) opened a new route from East Junction (near Hebronville in Attleboro) to Providence via Pawtucket in October 1847 to serve a new downtown Providence station. The B&P was acquired in 1888 by the Old Colony Railroad, which was in turn acquired by the New York, New Haven and Hartford Railroad in 1893. The Massachusetts Bay Transportation Authority (MBTA) was formed in 1964 to subsidize suburban commuter rail operations; the line became the Providence/Stoughton Line.

Planning and construction
	
In August 1987, the MBTA approved plans to build a new station at South Attleboro to relieve crowding at Attleboro station. Commuter service returned to Providence on February 1, 1988, but the Pawtucket/Central Falls station remained closed. The $3 million station was completed in September 1988; however, the Massachusetts Architectural Access Board (MAAB) refused to let the station open. The station did not meet state requirements for accessibility: the footbridge had only stairs and no ramps, and no high-level platforms had been built.

The MBTA built ramps and "mini-high" platforms (short sections of high-level platforms) at an additional cost of $1 million in mid-1989. However, the station remained closed because the MAAB insisted on full-length high-level platforms, while the MBTA wished to only build the cheaper mini-high platforms. The MBTA's appeal of the MAAB ruling (which came two years before the Americans with Disabilities Act mandated accessibility nationwide) had system-wide implications, particularly for the then-inaccessible Green Line.

South Attleboro station ultimately opened on July 30, 1990.

The MBTA began operating Providence– service for events at Gillette Stadium in 1997, with South Attleboro as one of the intermediate stops.

Reconstruction

In the 2010 Northeast Corridor Master Plan, Amtrak indicated long-term plans to add two outer station sidings and high-level platforms to South Attleboro, allowing Amtrak trains to pass stopped MBTA trains. More immediately, portions of the station were in poor condition, with a 2012 report indicating that two sets of stairs were closed due to rust damage. Although the station had mini-high platforms for level boarding, certain ADA-required elements such as tactile platform edges were missing.

MBTA plans for a $4.9 million renovation, which would not have fixed the footbridge, were criticized by local officials in 2019. That November, $4 million for design of a more extensive renovation was approved by the MBTA Fiscal Management Board. The project will include full-length high-level platforms, a new footbridge with elevators, an improved bus stop, and changes to the parking lot. Design work began in April 2020 and was expected to last 18 months. Some repairs were considered to be made in the interim.

On February 26, 2021, the station was closed due to deterioration of the overpass. By March 2021, the reconstruction was expected to cost $48 million, of which only $7 million had been funded; the existing station was expected to reopen in April. However, in May 2021 the MBTA indicated that the station would remain closed until the reconstruction project was complete. Design reached 75% completion in September 2021 and 100% in April 2022. In July 2022, the MBTA indicated that the old footbridge would be removed that fall. Early construction was expected to last through February 2023. However, by January 2023, funding for the station had not yet been approved.

Bus connections

By federal law, bus systems like RIPTA that receive federal funds usually cannot cross state lines; thus, despite demand, RIPTA previously could not run directly to the station. In 2009, the agency considered building a $300,000 bus turnaround for the 77 (now 1) route just over the Rhode Island border. In 2013, RIPTA began a two-year-long systemwide reorganization; one specific objective of the project was to secure federal permission to run directly to South Attleboro. RIPTA extended routes 1 and 35 to Bristol Place in June 2014. GATRA service to Bristol Place was discontinued prior to 2012 due to low ridership, but resumed in 2015.

References

External links

MBTA – South Attleboro
Station from Colvin Street on Google Maps Street View

Stations on the Northeast Corridor
MBTA Commuter Rail stations in Bristol County, Massachusetts
Stations along Old Colony Railroad lines
Stations along Boston and Providence Railroad lines
Railway stations in the United States opened in 1990
1990 establishments in Massachusetts